Gary Hugh Brown (born December 19, 1941) is an American artist, painter, draftsman, and Professor Emeritus of Art at the University of California, Santa Barbara. His work is included in permanent collections in the United States, including the Santa Barbara Museum of Art and the Art, Design & Architecture Museum. He has had over thirty-five one-person shows and has participated in 200 group exhibitions in Japan, Ireland, Brazil, and the United States.

Early life

Brown was born on December 19, 1941, in Evansville, Indiana. He is the son of Earl Hugh Brown (1917-2010) and Dorothy Aileen Lynch (1919-2020). Brown's grandfather and father were commercial union painters who significantly influenced and supported his interest in art and his focus on painting and draftsmanship. His maternal grandfather shared his knowledge of the ancient indigenous people, especially the Cahokia Empire. This gave Brown an appreciation of the value and impact of ancient history.

Brown went to McCutchanville grade school and North high school in Evansville, Indiana. At 16, he was staff artist on The North Star High School weekly paper, and was already planning to make a career in commercial art. In 1958, Brown was an Evansville Museum of Arts, History and Science Purchase Award winner and designed and painted sets for the Mesker Amphitheatre in Evansville. In 1959, he graduated from North High School.

Brown attended the University of Colorado at Boulder, Colorado in 1962. While attending the University he held a one-man exhibit at Schmuckler's Book Store titled Experimentations in Textural Surfaces. The paintings were completed after a summer in Arizona and Mexico. He received a BA degree at DePauw University in Greencastle, Indiana in 1963. DePauw University has the Gary Hugh Brown papers, a collection of news clippings and biography.

As a result of The Elizabeth Greenshields Foundation Travel Grant Brown was awarded in 1964 and 1965, he traveled to Florence, Italy to study at the Accademia di Belle Arti di Firenze with painting professor Pietro Annigoni (1910-1988). Brown started one of many handmade journals with artwork on his time in Italy. Brown did a drawing of the Giambologna's equestrian bronze at the Piazza della Santissima Annunziata when he was in Florence.

In 1966, Brown received a Masters of Fine Arts (MFA) from the University of Wisconsin–Madison in Madison, Wisconsin. Painter and Professor John Wilde chaired his MFA committee.

Career

Brown was Professor of Art at the University of California, Santa Barbara (UCSB) Art Studio Department for 40 years, from 1966-2006. For another seven years he taught drawing, painting, and journaling as professor Emeritus, during the summer at the College of Creative Studies at UCSB.

Artist, professor, Vietnam war: 1960s

After completing his MFA in 1966, Brown, at the age of 24, worked as an artist in Wisconsin, exhibiting his art at several galleries in the area. In that same year he accepted a position as assistant professor at UCSB.

Fold Variations: 1965-1984

Brown's Fold Variations depict light and shadow falling on illusionistic geomatic folds. In September 1966, Brown had a one-person exhibition at the Evansville Museum of Arts, History and Science in Evansville, Indiana, where he was reviewed by the The Courier-Journal. His work included Als ich kan (As I Can), a large folding six-panel screen in mixed drawing media 79" x 146" (1965-1966), and drawings done during his two years in Italy.

Brown exhibited his fold variations that included a poster Folded Drawings, raw pigment & charcoal on linen paper 29" x 22" in 1967, held at the Fleischer-Anhalt gallery exhibition on La Cienega Boulevard, Los Angeles, which was his first exhibition in Los Angeles.

From February 3 through 21, 1967, Brown had his first California one-man exhibition at Ventura College for the New Media Gallery in Ventura, California.

Brown Portraits series started in 1968 with Marci, charcoal, pastel, and spray paint, 24” x 18”, collection of Mrs. Frank Hamilton, Santa Barbara, California. His first assignment to all new students was the execution of a self-portrait and the discipline of keeping a journal on unlined sketchbooks.

From 1969 to 1970, Brown resided in New York City where he did large acrylic spray paintings on linen, with repeated folding planes.

Vietnam War

In 1968, the UCSB Faculty Committee, to help end the Vietnam War (1955-1975), commissioned Brown to do a antiwar poster, which became the Johnson's Baby Powder Made In U.S.A. made of three colors silkscreen on silver paper with a photograph by Felix Greene. Although the UCSB faculty did not accept the work, it was published in Milan, Italy and distributed worldwide except in the U.S.A. 

The "Johnson" referred to in the poster is President Lyndon B. Johnson, who escalated the Vietnam War, “Johnson’s Baby Powder” refers to Napalm, and the Johnson & Johnson familiar advertising logo was used for political art purpose for the first time.

By 1969, Brown had printed over 11 books, many with lithographic illustrations with text by friends including English poet Peter Whigham. He conducted a seminar course with Whigham entitled The Poet, The Artist, and the Book.

Residencies: 1970s

In the 1970s, Brown went on five residencies, which included Santa Cruz, California, Pajaro Dunes, California, Brookston, Indiana, New Harmony, Indiana, and Waterford/Dublin, Ireland.

In February 1971, Brown's folded lithographic prints were displayed at the Plaza Gallery of Fine Arts in Oxnard, California. His work was influenced by his travels to Mount Athos in Greece in 1964, to Mexico, Latin America, Chicago, Russia, Turkey, New York, and San Francisco.

In February 1972, Brown was awarded fifth prize in the Eighth Tyler National art exhibit, that showed at the Tyler Museum of Art in Tyler, Texas. He used pastel-colored strips of nylon entitled Abandon Ship Station No. 6, which was one of 25 works selected to exhibit from 2,000 U.S. entries. By this time Brown had been included in more than 40 exhibitions and 6 one-man shows.

Mayan Inca Journey

In the summer of 1971, Brown traveled to Oaxaca, Mexico, where he lived with a group of Zapotec Indians. In his Mayan Inca Journey, he drew the Mexican people and landscapes. Some of these drawings were shown at the University of Santa Clara and at the Santa Barbara Museum of Art (SBMA).

A lithographic poster called Mayan Journey Of Gary Brown with a self-portrait, watercolor, 22" x 32,” was the announcement for an exhibition at the Saisset Art Gallery, at the Santa Clara University, November 30-December 20, 1971. This poster is now in SBMA's permanent collection. A year later, another poster, titled Mayan Journey of Gary Brown, was shown at SBMA, January 8-February 2, 1972, Monte Alban Child, 1971, charcoal and coffee, collection of Mrs. Virginia Nugent, Evansville, Indiana. This poster is now in Art, Design & Architecture Museum (AD&A) Museum’s permanent collection at UCSB. Other works include Angel, 1971, charcoal with coffee wash, 30 x 22”, collection of the SBMA, collection of Ms. Ala Story; and Young Man With Parrot, 1972, charcoal, coffee and watercolor, 30 x 22”, collection of Brian Stowell, Reading, Massachusetts.

 Another exhibition in 1972, selected by Richard Ames a critic for the Santa Barbara News-Press, was at the Gallery de Silva in Montecito Village. It included Landscape Reflection, a self-portrait of Brown done in 1971.

Other works

Brown did the drawings of the Santa Cruz Mountain Poems, by poet and author Morton Marcus in November 1972. An edition of 1000 copies sold out and a 20th anniversary reprint of the book was published in 1992.

Brown worked on his Hand Series from 1972 to 1978. In 1972, his Farm Hand, a watercolor and pastel, 30" x 22," was in the collection of art works at the Upper Market Street Gallery in San Francisco.

Brown's Handmade Paper series appeared in the mid-seventies. He did the work Palm Reader in 1974, a video photoprint with tarlatan on handmade paper, 24 x 37," which was on display at a solo exhibit at the New Harmony Gallery of Contemporary Art in August 1976. The exhibit displayed mixed media prints, drawings, and paper constructions.

In 1974, Brown went on sabbatical to Ireland at the invitation of Professor Paul Funge, artist, Director of the Waterford School of Art where Brown was artist-in-residence. In Dublin he had a one person exhibition at the United Arts Club, one of the oldest art clubs in Europe.

Brown's Nature Series were done between 1974 and 1984. In 1978, at Santa Cruz Island off the coast of Santa Barbara, he drew Santa Cruz Island Fox (Urocyon littoralis), charcoal, 30 X 22”, collection of Helene Donnely, London, England. Others examples include Prickley Pear (1974), sepia watercolor pencil, 22 x 30;” Sea Rockets (1982), sepia watercolor pencil, 21 x 26”; and Lotus Land (1978), charcoal and ink on Kozo-shi paper, 26`1/2 ” x 37 3/4”.

He did the centerfold sketchbook for several books by Noel Young/Capra Press in 1974, (published under the pseudonym "Leon Elder"). These included the books Hot Tubs and Free Beaches.

In 1975, Brown gave a public slide lecture on the artist's illustrations of Alice in Wonderland as part of the UCSB Faculty Lecture Series, entitled Happy Unbirthday Lewis Carroll. He was able to get the UCSB Arts Library to purchase the Salvador Dalí tome of Alice In Wonderland (now in Special Collections). He did programs shaped like the Rabbit’s white gloves, titled The Manhattan Project’s Scripted Version of Alice, for the February 20 through March 1, 1975, Studio Theatre in Santa Barbara, California. He did the sets, costumes, and the programs with students of the Theater and Art Departments.

Brown did his Show Of Hands series in the 1970s, which were watercolors of hands of many kinds of people. In May 1976, Brown traveled to San Francisco for a solo exhibit called, Hands Across The Heavens, at the Source Gallery in San Francisco. It included a Hand Poster, watermarked with handmade paper done in 1979 for the Source Gallery in San Francisco. His Jaguar hand prints were used for the cover of Stonecloud, a publication by Dan Ilves in 1978. Inside the book were several other works by Brown.

Brown was commissioned by the New Harmony Historic Trust to celebrate the USA Bicentennial in 1976. He did a large poster called, New Harmony 1814-1976, printed by master printer John Begley, a lithograph of three colors 41 5/8 x 28 5/8”.

The Labyrinths paintings extend over twenty years. In 1977, Brown exhibited Labyrinths, at the New Harmony Gallery of Contemporary Art and at the Evansville Museum of Arts and Science. His Knossos Labyrinth was done with hot melt glue, charcoal, graphite, silver foil and paper, 37 x 24." It was a gift from the ARCO Collection, now in the SBMA permanent collection.

Brown's Cross Series were painted mainly in 1977 and consist of seven works. Examples included Latin Cross, 1977, charcoal and graphite on Chiri-gami, 39 1/2 x 241/2”; 5 X’s, 1977, graphite and charcoal aluminum and silver leaf on Shibu-gami, a persimmon skin stencil paper and metallic, 37 X 25”; and Gate, 1977, graphite, charcoal, conte, aluminum, bronze and gold with silver leaf on Izumo-shi, 25 x 37”.

He exhibited Grotesques At Lotusland (1979), sepia watercolor pencil, Arches paper, 22 X 32,” at Gallery de Silva in Santa Barbara. Lotusland is a non-profit botanical garden located in Montecito, near Santa Barbara. The same year, he exhibited Scribe (1979), charcoal, pastel, watercolor, silver leaf and rhoplex on Hosho-shi paper, 78 x 42”, in a collection of the ONE National Gay and Lesbian Archives at the University of Southern California Libraries in Los Angeles.

Brown's Figure Studies were done between 1975 to 1985 that included the tarot deck. The Gymnast Tarot (Two of Rings), was done in 1979, and is charcoal pencil on Hosho-shi handmade scroll paper, 79 x 42”, collection of Victor McCaslin, Fillmore, California. Other characters in the Tarot deck included, Fortune (1972), 79 x 42," Tarot Series, on Hosho-shi handmade scholl paper; Hanged Man (1979), charcoal pencil on Hosho-shi paper, hung as a scroll, 79 x 42”, a study in suspended animation; Scribe, charcoal, pastel, watercolor, silver leaf (1979); Charioteer (1979-1980), 78 x 42,” charcoal, conte, ink and graphite; and The Tower, a more radical Tarot study. A smaller version of Fortune, the size of a playing card mounted on a panel, 2009 12 x 16", is in AD&A Museum's permanent collection at UCSB.

Germany and Japan: 1980s

In the 1980s, Brown went on two residencies, which included West Germany and Japan.

In 1980, Brown accepted an invitation as artist-in-residence at the Atelierhaus Verein Worpswede Art Center in West Germany. In Germany, he did a lithographic print entitled, Physiognomy of different facial shapes and expressions. The next year Brown took a trip to Gabon, in Central Africa where a friend, Blaine Barrick, was serving in the Peace Corps. There, Brown did a sketchbook and the work titled African, (1981) charcoal, acrylic and rhoplex on Stonehenge paper 99 x 50".

Brown continued his exhibitions in Santa Barbara, California. In 1982, his exhibition, Anthology opened at the Art/Life Gallery on State Street in Santa Barbara. "We see Gary H. Brown re-emerged as a vital painter for Santa Barbara, Ventura, and L.A. counties, as well as for Southwest China" said Dr. Sophia G Kidd. Included were Brown's drawings of the Devereaux Series sketchbooks and prints at the Art/Life Gallery.

In 1984 through 2000, Brown donated 95 art objects to the AD&A Museum's permanent collection located on the campus of the UCSB.

In the fall of 1985, Brown did his residency at Art Space, Artists' Union in Nishinomiya, Hyōgo, Japan. He was a guest of Shozo Shimamoto (1928–2013), Professor of Western Painting, Kyoto University and Director of A U Art Space. While he was at Art Space he gave a lecture entitled, Physical and Spiritual Dislocation.

During his residency at Art Space, his life size Tarot deck was shown in group exhibitions in Okayama’s ZAP Gallery (1985), National Museum of Modern Art, Tokyo (1989), and Osaka’s ABC Gallery (1986). He visited numerous cultural sites, museums, temples in the cities of Osaka, Kyoto, Nara, Kanazawa, Takayama, Nashiko, and Nikko.

 The catalogue Gary H. Brown: A Survey Exhibition 1965-1985 was published for the Art Space Japan Exhibition and includes the work of Brown at Art Space. The catalogue has a preface by Shozo Shimamoto and an introduction by Alfred Moir. It includes chapters on Fold Variations (1965-1984), Cross Series (1977), Labyrinths (1976-1985), Portraits (1968-1984), Mayan Inca Journey (1971-1972), Nature Series (1974-1984), Show Of Hands (1972-1976), Handmade Paper (1973-1975), and Figure Studies (1975-1985).

The book Dreamworks, an interdisciplinary quarterly, published in 1986, has a chapter entitled, Images From A Portfolio by Gary Brown that includes two drawings, Landscape Reflection, (1971), and Nightmare, (1981).

Gay Advocacy: 1990s

In the 1990s, Brown was an activist supporting Gay Advocacy (now known as the LGBT movement) through the UC System. In addition to creating his own work to promote a deeper understanding of the AIDS crisis, using his visual language to confront ignorance about gender identity, stigma, and discrimination, Brown ensured that his work would be exhibited to diverse audiences. He utilized his platform within the UC system to promote other gay artists denied the opportunity to show their work based on controversial subject matter. During this time, Brown had one-man exhibits and gave public lectures in Japan, Ireland, and the United States, defending gay rights for dignity and equality.

 In November 1991, Brown had a solo exhibition at the Allan Hancock College Art Gallery in Santa Maria, California where he displayed paintings, drawings, and monoprints.

On January 27, 1992, Brown produced the first one-person show entitled New York Native, for social realist artist Patrick Angus at the College of Creative Studies (CCS) Gallery. CCS is one of the undergraduate colleges at the UCSB. The show broke attendance records. After the show the CCS Provost and Director of Student Health pulled all funding and promotion of Patrick's show considering it "inappropriate," and opted to create an age restriction for entry to 18 and posted a guard to enforce this restriction. Reacting to this censorship and discrimination, Brown contacted the artist David Hockney who then purchased several of Patrick's works in the show and promoted attendance. At a time of widespread homophobia, Brown legally formalized his domestic partnership, making him the first professor in the entire UC system to promote same-sex marriage in this way. Brown was on the first AIDS committee which was headed by the Director of Student Health, but he eventually resigned, feeling the committee was not actively combating homophobia and discrimination. There was urgency to move AIDS discussion and awareness into action in a substantive way, through public policy, social movement, and public opinion.

In 1993, Brown was a Press Liaison for Art Against AIDS, at the Venice Biennale during a semester in Venice. In 1995, Brown exhibited drawings, and paintings at the Emison Art Center at the DePauw University in Greencastle, Indiana.

In 1997, Brown was commissioned to create the 1997 AIDS Chronicles that was presented at a reception at the Sam Francis Gallery in Santa Monica, hosted at the Institute of Cultural Inquiry (ICI). The ICI's long-running AIDS-related project was the AIDS Chronicles, which spanned the years 1993-2014. At this time, the piece, Walking Through The Valley Of Death, was  done with colored pencils conté charcoal and watercolor, 50 x 42".

Brown said: "Over the course of the last decade, much of my work has centered on issues of life, love, loss and death. This recent work has been influenced by the AIDS crisis. A public art commission Fountain of Tears; Courtyard of Hope was completed at the entrance to Sarah House, a Santa Barbara AIDS Hospice facility."

Tea Fire: 2000s

In the 2000s, Brown continued his artistic and political response to the AIDS crisis, retired from UCSB, his father died, he was divorced, and lost his home and life's work in the Tea Fire in Santa Barbara. Brown continued to do residencies in Providence, Rhode Island and Santa Fe, New Mexico.

In 2001, David Leddick wrote about Brown in his book Male Nude Now: New Visions for the 21st Century.

Portrait of a Bookstore as an Old Man is a 2003 documentary about George Whitman, that was directed by Benjamin Sutherland and Gonzague Pichelin, in which Brown is a “talking head.”

In the Tea Fire of November 2008, Brown lost his home and everything in it, including his art collection. Brown donated a small print in 2008 to AD&A a few weeks prior to the blaze. After the Tea Fire destroyed his home, Brown showed A Replacement Residence, architectural plans of his new residence, illustrations, and colored pencil renditions at the James A. Schwalbach Gallery, University of Wisconsin, Baraboo, Wisconsin, from November 5 to December 14, 2012. Tom Kress did the plans and permits for Brown's new home after the fire.

In April 2009, an exhibit, Signs of His Times, honored Brown's commitment to AD&A and UCSB by highlighting selections from the gifts he had made to the museum since 1984. The exhibition ran from April 8 to June 14, 2009. The works that were on display corresponded to Brown's years of teaching at UCSB, from the 1960s to 2009. The exhibition included selections of Brown's own works, which demonstrated his background in figurative drawing and presented his most recent work of art.

Brown lives in Santa Barbara, with his partner, artist Robert W. Smart. After 47 years of teaching, he now spends his time on drawing, journaling, reading, and gardening. In Sept/Oct 2016, Brown did a sketchbook when he traveled with Smart to Greece. They went to Delphi, the Cyclades island of Amorgos, the Acropolis Museum, and Istanbul, Turkey on a separate trip. In the summer of 2017, Brown continued his sketchbooks when he went to Crab Lake in Wisconsin.

Brown exhibited at the Art City Gallery in Ventura, California from May 19 through June 23, 2018 for the Bad Exhibition: Value in Art. Anthology 2018 is now in the AD&A permanent collection at UCSB. In December 2020, Brown submitted a video at the 2020 SCREAM online exhibition for the LBCC Art Gallery in Long Beach City College Art Gallery.

Since 2020, Brown has been working with the Fourth Dimension Studio in Santa Fe, New Mexico with master printmaker Michael McCabe. He has done three sessions, the first in January 2020, with Surf's Up, monotype on Rives BFK, 32 x 22” (2020) and other prints; and the second session in March 2021, with deep indigo blue ink, in Kiss, monotype, image size 24" X 16” printed on 30" x 22,” cream Rives BFK France (2021); Rhino, monotype, image size 24 X 16”, printed on 30 x 22” white Rives BFK France (2021); and Red Tongue, monotype with chine colle, image size 24 X 16”, printed on 30" x 22” white Rives BFK France (2021).

Residencies, 1974-2022
 Fourth Dimension Studio, Santa Fe, New Mexico with master printmaker Michael McCabe (2020, 2021 & 2022)
 Nicholson File Art Studios, ceramic residency, David Allen, advisor, Providence, Rhode Island (2020, 2021, & 2022)
 Nijmegen, Netherlands (2000)
 Art Space Japan, Artist Union, Mishinomija Hyogo, Japan (1985)
 Atelierhaus Verein Worpswede Art Center, West Germany (1980)
 New Harmony Historical Trust, Bi-Centennial Residency (with Richard Meier), New Harmony, Indiana (1976)
 Twinrocker Paper Company, Brookston, Indiana (1975)
 United Arts Club, Fitzwilliam Square, Dublin, Ireland (1975)
 International Institute of Experimental Printmaking, Santa Cruz, California (1974)
 Community of Pajero Dunes California (1974)

Reviews

Solo exhibitions
Solo Exhibitions have been shown in Tokyo & Nishinomiya, Japan; Dublin, Ireland; Los Angeles, Beverly Hills, San Francisco, Santa Cruz and Santa Barbara, California; New York City; and Seattle, Washington, USA.

Public collections

Publications

Books

Catalogs

Posters

Public lectures

Set design

Film/video

Honors

See also
 Printmaking
 List of American artists 1900 and after

References

External links

 University of California, Santa Barbara General Catalog 2007/2008

1941 births
Painters from California
People from Indiana
20th-century American painters
21st-century American painters
Living people
University of California, Santa Barbara faculty
American LGBT artists
People from Evansville, Indiana